SlimBrowser is a tabbed multiple-site web browser from FlashPeak, Inc., an Austin, Texas-based company.

It formerly used the Microsoft Trident layout engine. It incorporates a large collection of features like built-in popup killer, skinned window frame, form filler, site group, quick-search, auto login, hidden sites, built-in commands and scripting, online translation, script error suppression, blacklist/whitelist filtering, and URL Alias.

SlimBrowser was one of the twelve browser choices offered to European Economic Area users of Microsoft Windows in 2010.

Since V6.0, SlimBrowser has adopted a multi-process architecture to improve stability and eliminate performance restrictions associated with traditional single-process browsers. SlimBrowser included a full-featured form filler with the support of multiple identities in V6.01.

After development had been paused, it started again in 2019, switching to Gecko engine, counting versions from V10.0.

FlashPeak also makes the cross-platform browser SlimJet which uses Chromium. SlimBoat used WebKit, but is no longer supported.

References

External links
Official website

Internet Explorer shells
Portable software
Windows web browsers
Software companies based in Texas